A K-line, or Knowledge-line, is a mental agent which represents an association of a group of other mental agents found active when a subject solves a certain problem or formulates a new idea. These were first described in Marvin Minsky's essay K-lines: A Theory of Memory, published in 1980 in the journal Cognitive Science:

When you "get an idea," or "solve a problem" ... you create what we shall call a K-line. ... When that K-line is later "activated", it reactivates ... mental agencies, creating a partial mental state "resembling the original."

"Whenever you 'get a good idea', solve a problem, or have a memorable experience, you activate a K-line to 'represent' it. A K-line is a wirelike structure that attaches itself to whichever mental agents are active when you solve a problem or have a good idea.

When you activate that K-line later, the agents attached to it are aroused, putting you into a 'mental state' much like the one you were in when you solved that problem or got that idea.  This should make it relatively easy for you to solve new, similar problems!" (1998, p. 82.)

References
Minsky, Marvin; The Society of Mind  March 15, 1998.
Minsky, Marvin; Papert, Seymour; Perceptrons: An Introduction to Computational Geometry  December 28, 1987.

Footnotes

External links
 Minsky's "K-lines: A Theory of Memory"
 Why Programming is a Good Medium for Expressing Poorly Understood and Sloppily Formulated Ideas

Artificial intelligence articles needing expert attention
Artificial intelligence